Sidney R. Snyder (July 30, 1926 – October 14, 2012) was an American businessman and politician.

Born in Kelso, Washington, he graduated from Kelso High School and went to Lower Columbia College. Snyder served in the United States Army Air Forces during World War II. In 1946, he owned and operated Sid's Market a grocery store in Seaview, Washington. He also founded a bank. In 1949, Snyder worked for the Washington State Legislature as an elevator operator and then as a clerk. In 1990 Snyder was elected to the Washington State Senate as a Democrat. He died in Long Beach, Washington.

References

1926 births
2012 deaths
People from Kelso, Washington
Businesspeople from Washington (state)
United States Army Air Forces personnel of World War II
Democratic Party Washington (state) state senators
20th-century American businesspeople